Anthidium echinatum is a species of bee in the family Megachilidae, the leaf-cutter, carder, or mason bees.

Synonyms
Synonyms for this species include:
Anthidium rohlfsii Friese, 1897
Anthidium (Echinanthidium) echinatum Klug, 1832

References

echinatum
Insects described in 1832